Sheila McGregor is a Scottish fibre artist, author and historian. She is most known for the books The Complete Book of Traditional Scandinavian Knitting and The Complete Book of Traditional Fair Isle Knitting.

Career 
Concerned about the oil industry's impact on the traditional way of life, McGregor started working on The Complete Book of Traditional Fair Isle Knitting in the mid 1970-s. She traveled to the Shetland Isles and some of the most remote places in Scotland, visiting knitters in their homes and at local events. She also studied pieces of historic knitting in private collections and museums across Shetland, Edinburgh, Glasgow and London. In the book she debunks many of the romantic stories behind the traditions of Shetland knitting, and instead records the actual history. 

For the follow-up The Complete Book of Traditional Scandinavian Knitting, she traveled to Scandinavia and here again talked to local knitters and studied knitted pieces in museums and collections. In the book, she shows how the Scandinavian tradition is connected to the Shetland tradition.

Both books feature descriptions of old techniques, the history behind the traditions, as well as traditional charts.

In 2014, McGregor donated some of her research to the Shetland Musem. The collection is open to researchers by appointment.

Personal life
McGregor lives in Edinburgh and was Chairman of Council at the Clan Gregor Society

Published works

 McGregor, Sheila (1981). The Complete Book of Traditional Fair Isle Knitting London: Batsford. 
 McGregor, Sheila (1984). The Complete Book of Traditional Scandinavian Knitting London: Batsford. 
 McGregor, Sheila (2003). Traditional Fair Isle Knitting (revised edition of former publication) Dover Publications Inc 
 McGregor, Sheila (2004). Traditional Scandinavian Knitting (revised edition of former publication) Dover Publications Inc

See also

 Alice Starmore
 Elizabeth Zimmerman
 Jane Gaugain
 Bill Gibb
 Emma Jacobsson
 Auður Laxness
 Mary Walker Phillips
 Meg Swansen
 Barbara G. Walker

References

External links

 Bibliography for Stranded Colourwork (tin can knits)
 Influences on Fair Isle knitwear design in the 1940s and 1950s (Fraser Knitwear)
 List about traditional kitting books (Traditionelstrik.dk)

Year of birth missing (living people)
Living people
People in knitting
British textile artists
Women textile artists
20th-century textile artists
20th-century women textile artists
Scottish non-fiction writers
British women non-fiction writers
Scottish women writers